Seals and Crofts was an American soft rock duo made up of Jimmy Eugene Seals (October 17, 1942 – June 6, 2022) and Darrell George "Dash" Crofts (born August 14, 1938) They are best known for their hits "Summer Breeze" (1972), "Diamond Girl" (1973), and "Get Closer" (1976), each of which peaked at No. 6 on the Billboard Hot 100 chart. Both members have long been public advocates of the Baháʼí Faith. Though the duo disbanded in 1980, they reunited briefly in 1991–1992, and again in 2004, when they released their final album, Traces.

Early careers
Jim Seals and Dash Crofts were both born in Texas, Seals in Sidney in 1942, and Crofts in Cisco in 1938.  They first met when Crofts was a drummer for a local band.  Later, Seals joined an outfit called Dean Beard and the Crew Cats, in which he played sax; later on, Crofts joined Seals in the band.  With Beard, they moved to Los Angeles to join the Champs, but the two did so only after the group's "Tequila" reached No. 1 in 1958.  Seals also spent time during 1959 in the touring band of Eddie Cochran.

Seals had a song ("It's Never Too Late") recorded by Brenda Lee in 1961, which was featured as the B-side of her U.S. Billboard No. 6 single, "You Can Depend on Me". "It's Never Too Late" nevertheless reached No. 101 on Billboard and No. 100 on Cash Box (week ending April 8, 1961) in its own right. In the UK, the sides were switched when the single was released, but the single failed to make the UK Singles Chart (at that time only a Top 50 listing).

By 1963, Seals, Crofts, Glen Campbell and Jerry Cole left the Champs to form a band named Glen Campbell and the GCs, which played at The Crossbow in Van Nuys, California. The band lasted only a couple of years before the members went their separate ways. Crofts returned to Texas and Seals joined a band named the Dawnbreakers (a reference to The Dawn-Breakers, a book about the beginnings of the Baha'i Faith). Crofts eventually returned to California to team up with Seals again, in the Dawnbreakers, and thus both Seals and Crofts were introduced to and became members of the Baháʼí Faith. After becoming longtime adherents of the Bahá'í Faith, a number of their songs began to include references to and passages from Bahá'í scripture. When they appeared in concert, they often remained on stage after the performance to talk about the faith, while local Bahá'ís passed out literature to anyone interested.

As Seals and Crofts
After the failure of The Dawnbreakers, the two decided to play as a duo, with Seals on guitar, saxophone and violin and Crofts on guitar and mandolin.  They signed a contract with the record division of Talent Associates (TA) in 1969 and released two LPs, of which only the second reached the Billboard 200 chart, peaking at No. 122 in October 1970.  Crofts married fellow Dawnbreaker Billie Lee Day in 1969 and Seals married Ruby Jean Anderson in 1970. The pair signed a new contract with Warner Bros. Records in August 1971. Their first album with their new label, Year of Sunday, peaked at #133 in the US. Their second Warner Bros. album, Summer Breeze, was a hit, peaking at No. 7 in 1972. The title cut was released as a single, peaking at #4 on the Adult Contemporary chart, and #6 Pop. The song "Hummingbird" was the second single released from the album, climbing to #12 AC, #20 Pop.
The album has since been certified 2× platinum by the RIAA for sales of two million copies in the US.

In 1973 Warner Bros. released Diamond Girl. That album has been certified gold for sales of 500,000 copies in the US. The title song reached No. 6 on the US chart in July 1973, and another single, "We May Never Pass This Way (Again)", peaked at No. 21.

The controversial Unborn Child followed in 1974. Written shortly after Roe v. Wade, Seals & Crofts expressed their anti-abortion position in the title song, which created a huge dilemma for radio stations. Some stations banned it while others added it to rotation. The album still went gold despite the controversy and the lack of a Top 40 hit.

The duo played at the California Jam festival in Ontario, California, on April 6, 1974.  Attracting over 200,000 fans, the concert put them alongside 1970s acts such as Black Sabbath; Eagles; Emerson, Lake & Palmer; Deep Purple; Earth, Wind & Fire; Black Oak Arkansas; and Rare Earth.  Portions of the show were telecast on ABC Television in the US, exposing the duo to a wider audience.

1975's I'll Play for You was a gold seller as well, featuring the No. 18 hit title track, and their multi-platinum selling Greatest Hits, released later the same year, has been certified 2× platinum

The duo had a return to the singles chart with the song "Get Closer", the title track from their 1976 album. Carolyn Willis (from the R&B vocal group Honey Cone) appeared on the song and it peaked at No. 6 in July of that year. Willis also joined them for their 1976 tour, which resulted in the live album Sudan Village.

The pair also recorded songs that appeared in the feature films One on One (1977) and Foolin' Around (1980), as well as the song "First Years" that was the theme song to the debut (1978–79) season of the television series The Paper Chase.

1978's Takin' It Easy featured the two branching out and experimenting with other types of sounds, including the disco influenced "You're the Love", which reached No. 18. But their gold selling days were behind them by this point.

In 1979 they contributed to the album Lote Tree, which was a narrated history of the Baháʼí Faith that included songs by them and other artists. It was distributed only within Baháʼí media outlets.

The Longest Road, released in 1980, was their last for Warner Brothers.

Hiatus and reunions 
In 1980, after a long and successful run of recordings in the 1970s, the two were dropped from Warner Brothers. As a result, they decided to take a hiatus from music. During the 1980s, despite no longer being officially together as a duo, they continued to appear at several Baháʼí gatherings, including a world peace concert at the Baháʼí Center in Los Angeles for the film and music community in February 1989. After this, they made the rounds of Canadian radio stations and some American talk shows to promote the Baháʼí Peace Document.

Crofts lived in Mexico, Australia, and then Nashville, Tennessee, playing country music and making occasional singles.  He currently resides on a ranch in the Texas Hill Country.  Seals moved to Costa Rica and had lived on a coffee farm off and on since 1980, as well as in Nashville and southern Florida.

In 1991, Seals and Crofts officially reunited and made concert appearances once again until disbanding a year later.

In 1998, Crofts released a solo CD titled Today, which contained some re-recordings of Seals and Crofts material.

In 2004, the duo reunited again and recorded their first new album since 1980, released as Traces.

In the early 2000s up to 2008, Seals embarked on various tours with his brother Dan ("England" Dan Seals, of England Dan & John Ford Coley), billing themselves as Seals & Seals and performing their successful hits from Seals & Crofts and England Dan & John Ford Coley, Dan's hits from his solo career and a few original songs written by the two brothers. A few shows featured Jim's sons Joshua on bass guitar and backing vocals and Sutherland on electric guitar.

Seals and Crofts were instrumental in both England Dan Seals and John Ford Coley becoming adherents of the Baha'i Faith, although Coley became a Christian some 28 years later. Dan Seals died of cancer in 2009.  At the time of his death, Dan and Jim Seals had been working on songs together. The status of those recordings is unknown.

In December 2010, the bandmates' daughters Juliet (Seals) Crossley and Amelia (Crofts) Dailey, along with Genevieve (Bogan) Dozier, daughter of Seals and Crofts engineer Joey Bogan, formed a musical trio called The Humming Birds. They released their self titled EP The Humming Birds in September 2012.

In 2018, Brady Seals (Jim's cousin) and Lua Crofts (Dash's daughter) began touring as Seals and Crofts 2, performing the catalog of Seals and Crofts, as well as some new music.

Seals' death
Seals had a stroke in 2017. After a long illness, he died at his home in Nashville, Tennessee, on June 6, 2022, at age 79.

Discography

Albums
 Seals & Crofts, 1969, No. 64 Canada Jul. 1970
 Down Home, 1970, No. 74 Canada Dec. 1970
 Year of Sunday, 1971, No. 133
 Summer Breeze, 1972, No. 7 (RIAA: 2× Platinum), No. 6 Can. Jan. 73
 Diamond Girl, 1973, No. 4 (RIAA: Gold), No. 8 Can. Sep. 73
 Unborn Child, 1974, No. 14 (RIAA: Gold), No. 18 Can. Apr. 74
 Seals & Crofts I & II, 1974, No. 69 Can. Sep. 74
 I'll Play for You, 1975, No. 30 (RIAA: Gold), No. 31 Can. Jun. 75
 Greatest Hits, 1975, No. 11 (RIAA: 2× Platinum), No. 8 Can. Jan. 76
 Get Closer, 1976, No. 37 (RIAA: Gold), No. 25 Can. Aug. 76
 Sudan Village, 1976, No. 73, No. 90 Can. Jan. 77
 One on One (soundtrack), 1977, No. 118
 Takin' It Easy, 1978, No. 78, No. 45 Can. Jul. 78
 Lote Tree, 1979
 Collection, 1979
 The Longest Road, 1980
 Traces, 2004

Singles

Songs in movies
 "These Moments Never Live Again", from Foolin' Around (1980)
 "My Fair Share" from One on One (1977)
 "Summer Breeze" from Dazed and Confused (1993)
 "Summer Breeze" from King of California (2007)
 "Summer Breeze" from Land of the Lost (2009)
 "Summer Breeze" from Vacation (2015)

See also
 "England" Dan Seals, Jim Seals' brother, was also a successful recording artist, first in the pop duo England Dan & John Ford Coley, and later as a country music artist.
 Troy Seals, country music artist, a cousin of Jim Seals.
 Brady Seals, a cousin of Jim Seals, frontman of the country groups Little Texas and Hot Apple Pie.

Notes

References

Bibliography
 Bentivegna, Anthony (ed.) sealsandcrofts.com, Novato, California, 2000–2013.
 George-Warren, H. (ed.) The Rolling Stone Encyclopedia of Rock & Roll, 3rd ed., Fireside, New York, 2001.
 Landau, Deborah. "Introducing Seals and Crofts", Stereo Review, January 1971.

External links
 Official website
 Seals and Crofts: Pop Troubadours site
 
 

American Bahá'ís
American pop rock music groups
American soft rock music groups
Folk rock groups from California
Carlton Records artists
Challenge Records artists
Warner Records artists
20th-century Bahá'ís
21st-century Bahá'ís
American musical duos
Soft rock duos
Male musical duos
Musical groups established in 1969
Musical groups disestablished in 1980
Musical groups from Los Angeles
Musical groups from Texas
1969 establishments in California
1980 disestablishments in California